Maksym Oleksandrovych Kovalenko (born 30 May 2002) is a Ukrainian professional footballer who plays as a goalkeeper for Ukrainian Premier League club Metalist 1925 Kharkiv.

Career
In summer 2022 he moved on loan to Hirnyk-Sport Horishni Plavni where he played 11 matches. In March 2023 he moved on loan to Nyva Vinnytsia in the Ukrainian Second League.

References

External links
 
 Profile on Metalist 1925 Kharkiv official website
 

2002 births
Living people
Footballers from Kharkiv
Ukrainian footballers
FC Metalist 1925 Kharkiv players
FC Hirnyk-Sport Horishni Plavni players
Ukrainian Premier League players
Ukrainian First League players
Association football goalkeepers